Dream Songs is the debut solo album by Canadian musician Devon Welsh. It was self-released through digital download on August 24, 2018 on Welsh's own label You Are Accepted. It was Welsh's first studio album as a solo artist since he and producer Matthew Otto concluded their musical project Majical Cloudz in 2016.

Written by Welsh, the album was recorded and produced by Braids' Austin Tufts in his Montreal studio. The album marked a clear departure from the electronic pop sound of Welsh's previous work to a more melodic, chamber pop sound with traditional instruments like guitar, piano, and orchestral strings.

Release
Dream Songs was self-released by Welsh through his own newly-created record label You Are Accepted. In contrast, the last two Majical Cloudz albums were distributed by Matador Records. In an interview with Billboard, Welsh explained, "I like making music, and I like putting it out there and having people listen to it. The stuff in the middle was stressful to me. I wanted to do it in a way where it was me making the choices and me taking the risks, where I felt like I didn’t have to take a label's vision into account -- or the expectations of anybody else in terms of what success would be defined as."

Critical reception

Reviewing the album for Exclaim!, Matt Bobkin stated that, "Dream Songs pushes Welsh's songcraft forward without abandoning his strengths." Writing for Pitchfork, Evan Rytlewski called Dream Songs an "unflinchingly candid debut solo album" and praised its instrumentation, calling it a "backdrop of lovely, spacious music that grants Welsh's pliable voice full freedom to preen, wander, and soar." BrooklynVegan's Andrew Sacher deemed the album "bigger and more complex, but not so much so that it ruins the intimacy that always made Devon's music appealing" and said, "When Devon rings out his notes, you can feel the passion that's driving every single word. These songs tend to be delicate, but they aren't passive. The emotional weight in these songs is so heavy, that even the quietest moments have no trouble commanding your attention."

Track listing

Personnel
Credits adapted from Bandcamp and Discogs.

 Devon Welsh – songwriting, string arrangement
 Thomas Beard – cello
 Ben Dwyer – double bass
 Christopher Honeywell – cover photograph
 Kyle Jukka – guitar 
 Kate Maloney – violin
 Austin Milne – saxophone 
 Harris Newman – mastering
 Austin Tufts – production, string arrangement
 Christoph Vandory – viola

References

2018 debut albums
Self-released albums